The Silent No More Awareness Campaign is a United States-based anti-abortion campaign of two larger organizations, Priests for Life and Anglicans for Life. It was co-founded in 2003 by Janet Morana, Executive Director of Priests for Life, and Georgette Forney, President of Anglicans for Life.

Positions 
The Silent No More Awareness Campaign has promoted a disproved  claim of abortion–breast cancer hypothesis, which posits a connection between abortion and breast cancer.

Silent No More has joined with other groups in protesting any modifications to the Partial-Birth Abortion Ban Act.

Public notability

Alveda King, niece of Martin Luther King Jr., frequently speaks on behalf of Silent No More. She has had two abortions. She has stated that, "I work in the civil rights movement of our century -- the right of every one of every race to live. [...] Abortion and racism are evil twins, born of the same lie."

References

External links
 Campaign Website

Anti-abortion organizations in the United States
Organizations established in 2003
2003 establishments in the United States